Frasier is an American television sitcom that was broadcast on NBC for 11 seasons. It premiered on September 16, 1993, and ended on May 13, 2004. The program was created and produced by David Angell, Peter Casey, and David Lee (as Grub Street Productions), in association with Grammnet (2004) and Paramount Network Television.

The series was created as a spin-off of the sitcom Cheers. It continues the story of psychiatrist Frasier Crane (Kelsey Grammer), who returns to his hometown, Seattle, as a radio show host. He reconnects with his father, Martin (John Mahoney), a retired police officer, and his younger brother, Niles (David Hyde Pierce), a fellow psychiatrist. Included in the series cast were Peri Gilpin as Frasier's producer Roz Doyle, and Jane Leeves as Daphne Moon, Martin's live-in caregiver. Dan Butler's role as Bob "Bulldog" Briscoe, a sports talk show host on Frasier's station, was later upgraded from a recurring to main character.

Frasier was critically acclaimed, with the series and the cast winning thirty-seven Primetime Emmy Awards, a record at the time for a scripted series. It also won the Primetime Emmy Award for Outstanding Comedy Series for five consecutive years. A revival spin-off is due to be released on Paramount+ in mid-2023.

Overview

Psychiatrist Frasier Crane (Grammer) returns to his hometown of Seattle, Washington, following the end of his marriage and life in Boston (as seen in Cheers). His plans for a new life as a single man are challenged. Adding to this, he is obliged to take in his father, Martin (Mahoney), a retired Seattle Police Department detective who has mobility problems after being shot in the line of duty during a robbery.

After reluctantly taking his father in, Frasier and Martin conduct a series of interviews to hire a physical therapist and caregiver for his father. Martin, much to Frasier's dismay, is particularly keen on hiring a British caregiver as a live-in, and after a short squabble, the two agree to hire Daphne Moon (Leeves) for the position. Much of the series focuses on Frasier adjusting to living with his father, with whom he has little in common, and his constant annoyances with Martin's dog, Eddie. Frasier frequently spends time with his younger brother, Niles (Pierce), a fellow psychiatrist, who becomes attracted to Daphne and eventually marries her.

Frasier hosts The Dr. Frasier Crane Show, a call-in psychiatry show on talk radio station, KACL. Though they share few commonalities, Frasier's producer, Roz Doyle (Gilpin) becomes his friend in the series. In the show, she is depicted as both direct and sarcastic, and until she becomes pregnant with her daughter, Alice, her somewhat superficial relationships with men are a topic of conversation. However, Roz and Frasier share a professional respect and a wry sense of humor, and, over time, the two become close friends. Frasier, along with the other characters in the series, often visits the local coffee shop, Café Nervosa, making it a frequent setting in the show.

The Crane brothers, who have expensive tastes, intellectual interests, and high opinions of themselves, frequently clash with their father, Martin. The close relationship between the brothers is often tense, and their sibling rivalry intermittently results in chaos. For two psychiatrists who make a living solving other people's problems, however, they are often inept at dealing with each other's hangups. Other recurring themes in the series include Niles's relationship with his unseen first wife, Maris (whom he later divorces), Frasier's relationship with his ex-wife, Lilith, who resides in Boston with their son Frederick, Frasier's search for love, Martin's new life after retirement, and the various attempts by the two brothers to gain acceptance into Seattle society.

Characters

Main
 Kelsey Grammer as Frasier Crane, a radio psychiatrist. He is fussy, uptight, cultured, and sometimes arrogant. Having grown up with an educated mother and an "average Joe" father, Frasier epitomises an upper-class sophistication, yet is still sympathetic to working-class culture. After returning to Seattle, he begins embracing his more privileged background, and develops a more selfish and aloof manner, possibly due to rekindling his relationship with his younger brother, Niles Crane. Despite his haughty demeanor, however, Frasier has a strong sense of ethics.
 Jane Leeves as Daphne Moon (later Crane), is an English immigrant from Manchester; a physiotherapist and live-in aid hired by Frasier to help his father. Daphne's eccentric, working-class background and self-professed psychic abilities (which often end up being correct) frequently lead to Daphne's comical non-sequiturs about her unusual family, which is a sharp contrast to the Cranes' incredulity. In spite of their different upbringings, Niles falls for her instantly. Niles's obsession with Daphne and her obliviousness to this is developed throughout the earlier seasons of the series.
 David Hyde Pierce as Niles Crane, Frasier's younger brother. He is a psychiatrist in private practice. Educated, cold-hearted, and more arrogant than Frasier, Niles's snobby, anxious qualities provide a foil for Frasier's own issues. Despite his aforementioned qualities, he is brave, caring, and well-meaning, which, to his loved ones, more than makes up for his eccentricities and quirks. Niles is very close to his older brother, though their fiercely competitive natures often provide the audience with much humor throughout the series. Like Frasier, Niles has a deep appreciation and respect for the arts, music, and pursuits which are seen as intellectual and prefers these activities over most sports, though he excels in squash and croquet. Niles is severely mysophobic, often given to wiping his hands after human contact, and is even depicted wiping down chairs in public places before sitting on them.
 Peri Gilpin as Roz Doyle, the producer of Frasier's radio show. A native of Bloomer, Wisconsin, Roz, one of two single women in the series, is depicted as a sharp contrast to Daphne. Throughout the show, Roz's search for love and liberal approach to dating is the subject of many witty remarks, particularly from Niles. In the middle of series' run, Roz becomes pregnant with her first child, Alice, and the show addresses some of the challenges of being a single mother, including Roz having to borrow money from her boss, and the personal and professional strain that places on their relationship.
 John Mahoney as Martin Crane, Frasier and Niles's father, is an outspoken and laid-back Seattle police detective who was forced to retire after sustaining a gunshot wound to his hip. Because this injury renders him incapable of living alone, upon Frasier's return to Seattle, Martin is forced to accept Frasier's invitation to live with him. Though he and his sons share few commonalities, the relationship between the three men strengthens throughout the series. Martin's relationship with his Jack Russell terrier, Eddie, and his pea-green tartan- and twill-upholstered recliner are a perpetual source of distress for Frasier. He is also known for his fondness for beer (specifically that for Ballantine).
Moose and Enzo as Eddie, Martin's pet dog. Eddie annoys Frasier in many ways, especially by staring at him for long periods. Even so, Frasier occasionally shows kindness to Eddie by petting him, taking him for a walk, or giving him edible treats.

Recurring
 Dan Butler as Bob "Bulldog" Briscoe (seasons 4–6; recurring season 1; special appearance seasons 2–3; special guest seasons 7, 9, 10 & 11), the womanizing, misogynistic host of "Bob 'Bulldog' Briscoe and the Gonzo Sports Show", which follows Frasier's time slot at KACL.
 Marsha Mason as Sherry Dempsey (seasons 4–5), Martin's flamboyant girlfriend, whose tastes and opinions are often a cause of antagonism and arguments with the rest of the family.
 Edward Hibbert as Gil Chesterton (seasons 2–8 & 10–11; guest season 1), KACL's posh, camp restaurant critic, his arguably "effeminate" nature is the source of many gay innuendo on the show, despite him revealing early in the series that he is married to a woman who is a car mechanic by trade.
 Patrick Kerr as Noel Shempsky (seasons 6–11; guest seasons 1 & 3–5), KACL technical assistant and avid Star Trek aficionado who speaks fluent Klingon and constantly harasses Roz
 Tom McGowan as Kenny Daly (seasons 7–11; guest seasons 5–6), KACL's station manager
 Harriet Sansom Harris as Bebe Glazer (seasons 1–5, 7, 9–11), Frasier's flirtatious and duplicitous agent. Described by Niles as "Lady Macbeth without the sincerity," she will use any method to get her or her clients the best deal.
 Millicent Martin as Gertrude Moon (season 9–10; guest season 7, 11), Daphne's mother
 Brian Klugman as Kirby Gardner (season 9; guest season 8), a part-timer at KACL and the son of Frasier's former classmate
 Ashley Thomas as Alice Doyle (seasons 10–11; co-star season 9), Roz's daughter
 Felicity Huffman as Julia Wilcox (seasons 10–11), host of a financial news segment, whose personality leads to frequent clashes with others at KACL

Notes
The main cast remained unchanged for all 11 years. When the series ended in 2004, Grammer had portrayed the character of Frasier Crane for a total of 20 years, including his nine seasons on Cheers plus a one-time performance as the character on the series Wings which earned Grammer an Emmy nomination. At the time, he tied James Arness' portrayal of Matt Dillon on Gunsmoke for the longest-running character on American primetime television. The record has since been surpassed in animation by the voice cast of The Simpsons, and in live action by Richard Belzer's portrayal of John Munch and Mariska Hargitay's portrayal of Olivia Benson (both on Law & Order: Special Victims Unit, among several other series). Grammer was briefly the highest-paid television actor in the United States for his portrayal of Frasier, while Jane Leeves was the highest-paid British actress.

In addition to those of the ensemble, additional story lines included characters from Frasier's former incarnation on Cheers, such as his ex-wife Lilith Sternin, played by Bebe Neuwirth, and their son Frederick, played by Trevor Einhorn.

Reunions 
Grammer had been the voice of Sideshow Bob on The Simpsons since 1990. In a 1997 episode (while Frasier was still in production), the character's brother, Cecil Terwilliger, was introduced, played by Pierce, as per the reference in the episode title, "Brother from Another Series". The episode contained numerous Frasier references, including a Frasier-style version of The Simpsons theme for a transition and its iconic title card for the same thing. Pierce returned as Cecil for the second time (the first since Frasier had concluded) alongside Grammer in the 2007 episode "Funeral for a Fiend". The episode introduced the brothers' father, Dr. Robert Terwilliger, who was portrayed by Mahoney.

Cast reunions also occurred on four episodes of Hot in Cleveland, which featured Leeves in the main cast along with Wendie Malick (who played Martin's girlfriend towards the end of Frasier). In the season-two episode "Unseparated at Birth" and season-three episode "Funeral Crashers," Mahoney guest-starred as a waiter smitten with Betty White's character. Gilpin appeared in the episode "I Love Lucci (Part 1)", and Tom McGowan (who played Kenny Daly) appeared in "Love Thy Neighbor" as a casting director. Hot in Cleveland was created and produced by Suzanne Martin, who wrote multiple episodes of Frasier.

Production

Creation 
During the eighth season of Cheers, Grammer made a deal with former Cheers producers David Angell, Peter Casey, and David Lee (who were moving on to produce Wings) that they would do a new series together once Cheers ended. Once it became clear during the 10th season that the 11th would be the last, the group began working on their next series together.

Grammer did not originally want to continue playing Frasier Crane, and Angell, Casey, and Lee did not want the new show to be compared to Cheers, which they had worked on before Wings. The three proposed that the actor play a wealthy, Malcolm Forbes-like paraplegic publisher who operated his business from his apartment. The main show featured a "street-smart" Hispanic live-in nurse who would clash with the main character. While Grammer liked the concept, Paramount Television disliked it, and suggested that the best route would be to spin off the Frasier Crane character. Grammer ultimately agreed to star in a Cheers spin-off, but the producers set the new show as far from Boston as possible to prevent NBC from demanding that other characters from the old show make guest appearances on the new show during its first season. After first choosing Denver, Angell, Casey, and Lee changed the location to Seattle after Colorado passed a law that prevented municipalities from enacting anti-discrimination laws protecting gay, lesbian, or bisexual people.

The creators did not want Frasier in private practice, which would make the show resemble The Bob Newhart Show. From an unused idea they had for a Cheers episode, they conceived the concept of the psychiatrist working in a radio station surrounded by "wacky, yet loveable" characters. After realizing that such a setting was reminiscent of WKRP in Cincinnati, the creators decided to emphasize Frasier's home life, which Cheers had rarely explored. Lee considered his own experience with "the relationship between an aging father and the grown-up son he never understood" and thought it would be a good theme for Frasier. Although Frasier had mentioned on Cheers (in two episodes) that his father, a research scientist, had died, Angell, Casey, and Lee did not realize this was the case, as they were not working on Cheers during the season those two episodes were filmed. The creative team was already well into the development process when Grammer pointed out the discontinuity; they decided to overlook it, initially retconning the character's backstory. In a second-season episode, the discrepancy was resolved, as Frasier revealed he had lied to the Cheers gang about his father.

One element of the original concept that was carried over was the live-in health-care provider for Frasier's father. Grammer points out that very little of the Frasier Crane of Cheers carried over to Frasier, as his family history was changed (though this was later adjusted); the setting, his job, and even the character himself changed from the Cheers predecessor, having to be more grounded as the central character of the show so the other supporting characters could be more eccentric.

Casting 
Martin Crane was based on creator Casey's father, who spent 34 years with the San Francisco Police Department. The creators suggested to NBC that they would like to cast someone like Mahoney, to which NBC told them if they could get Mahoney, they could hire him without auditions. Both Grammer and the producers contacted Mahoney, with the producers flying to Chicago to show Mahoney the pilot script over dinner. Upon reading it, Mahoney accepted. Grammer, who had lost his father as a child, and the childless Mahoney immediately built a close father-son relationship.

In discussing Martin's nurse, Warren Littlefield of NBC suggested she be English instead of Hispanic and suggested Leeves for the role. Grammer was initially reluctant, as he thought the casting made the show resemble Nanny and the Professor, but approved Leeves after a meeting and read-through with her. Mahoney and Leeves quickly bonded over their shared English heritage; Mahoney was originally from Manchester, the hometown of Leeves's character.

The character of Niles was not part of the original concept for the show. Frasier had told his bar friends on Cheers that he was an only child; however, Sheila Guthrie, the assistant casting director on Wings, brought the producers a photo of Pierce (whom she knew from his work on The Powers That Be) and noted his resemblance to Grammer when he first appeared on Cheers. She recommended him should they ever want Frasier to have a brother. The creators were "blown away" both by his resemblance to Grammer and by his acting ability. They decided to ignore Frasier's statement on Cheers and created the role for Pierce. Pierce accepted the role before realizing he had not read a script. Once he was given a script, he was initially concerned that his character was essentially a duplicate of Frasier, thinking that it would not work. The first table reading of the pilot script was notable because the producers had never heard either Pierce or Mahoney read lines because they were cast without auditions.

The only main role that required an audition was Roz Doyle, who was named in memory of a producer of Wings. The producers auditioned around 300 actresses with no particular direction in mind. Women of all ethnicities were considered. Lisa Kudrow was originally cast in the role, but during rehearsals, the producers decided they needed someone who could appear more assertive in her job and take control over Frasier at KACL, and Kudrow did not fit that role. The creators quickly hired Gilpin, their second choice.

The original focus of the series was intended to be the relationship between Frasier and Martin, and it was the focus of most of the first-season episodes. Once the show began airing, Niles became a breakout character, and more focus was added to the brothers' relationship, and other plots centering on Niles, starting in the second season. The producers initially did not want to make Niles's wife Maris an unseen character because they did not want to draw parallels to Vera, Norm's wife on Cheers. They originally intended that she would appear after several episodes, but were enjoying writing excuses for her absence so much that they eventually decided she would remain unseen, and after the increasingly eccentric characteristics ascribed to her, they concluded that no real actress would be able to portray her anyway.

Sets and settings 
Frasier's apartment was designed to be ultra-modern in an eclectic style (as Frasier himself points out in the pilot). One of the show's signature elements that it became well known for was the apartment's design which included elements such as a slightly split-level design, doors with triangular wooden inlay features, numerous pieces of well-known high-end furniture (such as a replica of Coco Chanel's sofa, and both Eames Lounge Chair and Wassily Chair) and a notable view from the terrace which was frequently complimented by visitors. The main set consisted of the open-concept living area with a sitting/TV space and dining area on the lower level and a piano exit to the terrace on the rear upper level. The set also included the kitchen through an open archway. A small section of the building corridor and elevator doors was built, as was a powder room near the front entrance. Two corridors off the living area ostensibly led to the apartment's three bedrooms. Sets for each of these rooms were built as separate sets on an as-needed basis.

No building or apartment in Seattle really has the view from Frasier's residence. It was created so the Space Needle, the most iconic landmark of Seattle, would appear more prominently. According to the season-one DVD bonus features, the photograph used on the set was taken from atop a cliff, possibly the ledge at Kerry Park, a frequent photography location. Despite this, Frasier has been said to have contributed to the emergence of an upscale urban lifestyle in 1990s Seattle, with buyers seeking properties in locations resembling that depicted in the show, in search of "that cosmopolitan feel of Frasier".

Another of the primary sets was the radio studio at KACL from which Frasier broadcasts his show. The studio itself consists of two rooms: the broadcast booth and the control room. A section of the corridor outside of the booth was also built (visible through the windows at the back of the studio) and could be shot from the side to view the corridor itself. The set was designed based on ABC's then-brand-new radio studios in Los Angeles which the production designer visited. Technical elements such as the microphones were regularly updated to conform with the latest technology. Although the studio set lacked a "front" wall (the fourth wall), one was built for occasional use in episodes with certain moments shot from behind the broadcast desk, rather than in front of it as usual.

The producers wanted to have a gathering place outside of home and work where the characters could meet. After a trip to Seattle, and seeing the many burgeoning coffee shops, the production designer suggested to producers that they use a coffee shop. Unlike many of the relatively modern coffee shop designs prevalent in Seattle, the production designer opted for a more warm and inviting style which would appear more established and traditional. Stools were specifically omitted to avoid any similarity to the bar on Cheers. Several Los Angeles coffee shops were used for reference. A bookcase was added on the back wall, suggesting patrons could grab a book and read while they enjoyed their coffee. The show used three versions of the interior set depending on how much space other sets for each episode required. If space for the full set was not available, a smaller version that omitted the tables closest to the audience could be used. If space for that set was lacking, a small section of the back of the cafe at the top of the steps could be set up under the audience bleachers. A set was also used on occasion for the exterior patio.

Filming 
The cast had an unusual amount of freedom to suggest changes to the script. Grammer used an acting method he called "requisite disrespect" and did not rehearse with the others, instead learning and rehearsing his lines once just before filming each scene in front of a live studio audience. Although effective, the system often caused panic among guest stars.

In 1996, Grammer's recurrent alcoholism led to a car accident. The cast and crew performed an intervention that persuaded him to enter the Betty Ford Center, delaying production for a month.

Only one episode, "The 1000th Show," was filmed in Seattle. As with Cheers, most episodes were filmed on Stage 25, Paramount Studios, or at various locations in and around Los Angeles.

Celebrity voice cameos 

The KACL callers' lines were read by anonymous voice-over actors during filming in front of a live audience, and during post-production, the lines were replaced by celebrities, who actually phoned in their parts without having to come into the studio. The end credits of season finales show greyscale headshots of celebrities who had "called in" that season. Celebrities providing voices as callers include Gillian Anderson, Kevin Bacon, Halle Berry, Mel Brooks, Cindy Crawford, Billy Crystal, Phil Donahue, David Duchovny, Hilary Duff, Olympia Dukakis, Carrie Fisher, Jodie Foster, Art Garfunkel, Macaulay Culkin, Elijah Wood, Linda Hamilton, Daryl Hannah, Ron Howard, Eric Idle, Stephen King, Jay Leno, Laura Linney, John Lithgow, Yo-Yo Ma, William H. Macy, Henry Mancini, Reba McEntire, Helen Mirren, Mary Tyler Moore, Estelle Parsons, Rosie Perez, Freddie Prinze Jr., Christopher Reeve, Carly Simon, Gary Sinise, Mary Steenburgen, Ben Stiller, Marlo Thomas, Rob Reiner, Carl Reiner, Lily Tomlin, and Eddie Van Halen.

Some "callers" also guest-starred, such as Parsons, Perez, and Linney (who played Frasier's final love interest in the last season).

Credits 
The show's theme song, "Tossed Salads and Scrambled Eggs," is sung by Grammer and is played over the closing credits of each episode. Composer Bruce Miller, who had also composed for Wings, was asked to avoid explicitly mentioning any subjects related to the show such as radio or psychiatry. After Miller finished the music, lyricist Darryl Phinnesse suggested the title as they were things that were, like Frasier Crane's patients, "mixed up". The lyrics indirectly refer to Crane's radio show; "I hear the blues a-callin'," for example, refers to troubled listeners who call the show. Grammer recorded several variations of the final spoken line of the theme, which were rotated for each of the episodes. Other than season finales, a short, silent scene, often revisiting a small subplot aside from the central story of the episode, appears with the credits and song, which the actors performed without written dialogue based on the scriptwriter's suggestion.

The title card at the start of each episode shows a white line being drawn in the shape of the Seattle skyline on a black background above the show's title. In most episodes, once the skyline and title appear, the skyline is augmented in some way, such as windows lighting up or a helicopter lifting off. The color of the title text changed for each season (respectively: blue, red, turquoise, purple, gold, brown, yellow, green, orange, metallic silver, and metallic gold). Over the title card, one of about 25 brief musical cues evoking the closing theme is played.

Revival 

On February 24, 2021, a revival series was greenlit for exclusive debut on Paramount+. Described as a "third act" and another spin-off, Grammer said he "gleefully" anticipated "sharing the next chapter in the continuing journey of Dr. Frasier Crane" as he had "spent over 20 years" of his "creative life on the Paramount lot". In October 2022, Paramount+ officially gave the series a season order of 10 episodes. In January 2023, Jack Cutmore-Scott joined the cast as Freddy Crane. It was also reported that English actor Nicholas Lyndhurst would be joining the cast. Anders Keith and Jess Salgueiro were later cast as Niles and Daphne's son and Freddy's roommate, respectively. In February, Toks Olagundoye was cast as Olivia.

Relationship to Cheers 
With the exception of Rebecca Howe (Kirstie Alley), all the surviving main regular cast members of Cheers made appearances on Frasier. Lilith Sternin (Bebe Neuwirth) was the only one to become a recurring character, appearing in a total of twelve episodes.

In the eighth-season Cheers episode "Two Girls for Every Boyd," Frasier tells Sam Malone (played by Ted Danson) that his father, a research scientist, had died. In the Frasier season-two episode "The Show Where Sam Shows Up," when Sam meets Martin, Frasier explains that at the time, he was angry after an argument with his father on the phone; however, in "The Show Where Woody Shows Up," when meeting Martin, Woody says he remembers hearing about him.

In the ninth-season episode of Frasier, "Cheerful Goodbyes" in 2002, Frasier returns to Boston to give a speech and Niles, Daphne, and Martin come along to see the city. Frasier runs into Cliff Clavin (played by John Ratzenberger) at the airport and learns that Cliff is retiring and moving to Florida. Frasier and company attend Cliff's retirement party, where Frasier reunites with the rest of the gang from Cheers (minus Sam, Woody, Diane and Rebecca), including bar regular Norm Peterson (played by George Wendt), waitress Carla Tortelli (played by Rhea Perlman), barflies Paul Krapence (played by Paul Willson) and Phil (played by Philip Perlman), and Cliff's old post-office nemesis Walt Twitchell (played by Raye Birk).

In the 11th-season episode of Frasier, "Caught in the Act," Frasier's married ex-wife, children's entertainer Nanny G, comes to town and invites him backstage for a rendezvous. Nanny G appeared on the Cheers episode "One Hugs, The Other Doesn't" (1992) and was portrayed by Emma Thompson. In this episode of Frasier, she is portrayed by Laurie Metcalf. A younger version of the character (this time played by Dina Waters) appears in the second episode of season 9 of Frasier, "Don Juan in Hell: Part 2," along with Neuwirth and Shelley Long reprising their roles of Lilith and Diane Chambers, respectively. In this episode, Rita Wilson also reprises her role as Frasier's mother, Hester, which she briefly debuted in the season 7 premiere, "Momma Mia;" in "Don Juan in Hell: Part 2," Diane also references the season 3 episode of Cheers, "Diane Meets Mom," in which Hester (then portrayed by Nancy Marchand) threatens Diane's life. Diane (again portrayed by Long) plays a central role in "The Show Where Diane Comes Back" (season 3, episode 14) and had a brief cameo in the season 2 episode "Adventures in Paradise: Part 2".

Some cast members of Frasier had appeared previously in minor roles on Cheers. In the episode "Do Not Forsake Me, O' My Postman" (1992), John Mahoney played Sy Flembeck, an over-the-hill jingle writer hired by Rebecca to write a jingle for the bar. In it, Grammer and Mahoney exchanged a few lines. Peri Gilpin appeared in a Cheers episode titled "Woody Gets an Election" playing a reporter who interviews Woody when he runs for office.

The set of Frasier was built over the set of Cheers on the same stage after it had finished filming.

Reception

Critical reaction 
Frasier is one of the most critically acclaimed comedy series of all time and one of the most successful spin-off series in television history. Critics and commentators have broadly held the show in high regard.

Caroline Frost said that the series overall showed a high level of wit, but noted that many critics felt that the marriage of Daphne and Niles in season 10 had removed much of the show's comic tension. Ken Tucker felt that their marriage made the series seem desperate for storylines, while Robert Bianco felt that it was symptomatic of a show that had begun to dip in quality after so much time on the air. Kelsey Grammer acknowledged the creative lull, saying that over the course of two later seasons, the show "took itself too seriously". Commentators acknowledged that there was an improvement following the return of the writers Christopher Lloyd and Joe Keenan, although not necessarily to its earlier high standards.

Writing about the first season, John O'Connor described Frasier as being a relatively unoriginal concept, but said that it was generally a "splendid act," while Tucker thought that the second season benefited greatly from a mix of "high and low humor". Tucker's comment is referring to what Grammer described as a rule of the series that the show should not play down to its audience. Kevin Cherry believes that Frasier was able to stay fresh by not making any contemporary commentary, therefore allowing the show to be politically and socially neutral. Other commentators, such as Haydn Bush disagree, believing the success of Frasier can be attributed to the comedic timing and the rapport between the characters. Joseph J. Darowski and Kate Darowski praise the overall message of the series, which across eleven seasons sees several lonely, broken individuals develop warm, caring relationships. While individual episodes vary in quality, the series as a whole carries with it a definitive theme and evolution from pilot to finale. The Economist devoted an article to the 25th anniversary of the show's premiere stating, "it is clear that audiences still demand the sort of intelligent and heartfelt comedy that “Frasier” provided."

In spite of the criticisms of the later seasons, these critics were unanimous in praising at least the early seasons, with varied commentary on the series' demise ranging from believing, like Bianco, that the show had run its course to those like Dana Stevens, who bemoaned the end of Frasier as the "end of situation comedy for adults". Critics compared the farcical elements of the series, especially in later seasons, to the older sitcom Three's Company. NBC News contributor Wendell Wittler described the moments of misunderstanding as "inspired by the classic comedy of manners as were the frequent deflations of Frasier’s pomposity".

In 2017, 13 years after the show ended, Frasier was said to have experienced a "renaissance" on Netflix and "achieved a second life as one of the streaming service's most soothing offerings".

Awards 

The series won a total of 37 Primetime Emmy Awards during its 11-year run, breaking the record long held by CBS' The Mary Tyler Moore Show (29). It held the record until 2016 when Game of Thrones won 38. Grammer and Pierce each won four, including one each for the fifth and eleventh seasons. The series is tied with ABC's Modern Family for the most consecutive wins for Outstanding Comedy Series, winning five from 1994 to 1998.

Grammer has been Emmy-nominated for playing Frasier Crane on Cheers and Frasier, as well as a 1992 crossover appearance on Wings, making him the only performer to be nominated for playing the same role on three different shows. The first year Grammer did not receive an Emmy nomination for Frasier was in 2003 for the 10th season. However, Pierce was nominated every year of the show's run, breaking the record for nominations in his category, with his eighth nomination in 2001; he was nominated a further three times after this.

In 1994, the episode "The Matchmaker" was ranked number 43 on TV Guides 100 Greatest Episodes of All Time. In 2000, the series was named the greatest international programme of all time by a panel of 1,600 industry experts for the British Film Institute as part of BFI TV 100. In 2002, Frasier was ranked number 34 on TV Guides 50 Greatest TV Shows of All Time. In a 2006 poll taken by Channel 4 of professionals in the sitcom industry, Frasier was voted the best sitcom of all time.

Fandom and cultural impact 
Frasier began airing in off-network syndication on September 15, 1997. It is available on Cozi TV, Hallmark Channel, Amazon Prime Video, Hulu, Paramount+, Peacock and Crave in select countries. Netflix stopped offering the show in 2020.

The show's popularity has resulted in several fan sites, podcasts, and publications. Podcasts that look primarily at the show include Talk Salad and Scrambled Eggs with Kevin Smith and Matt Mira and Frasierphiles.

A soundtrack to the series was released in 2001.

Books 
 Cafe Nervosa: The Connoisseur's Cookbook, claimed to be authored by Frasier and Niles Crane and published while the show was still in production.
 Frasier: A Cultural History by Joseph J. Darowski and Kate Darowski, published by Rowman & Littlfield in 2017 as part of their Cultural History of Television series, analyzes the show and offers insights into onscreen stories and behind-the-scenes efforts to shape it.
 Frasier: The Official Companion to the Award-Winning Paramount Television Comedy by Jefferson Graham offers a behind-the-scenes look at the series and several collections of scripts.
 My Life as a Dog, published as an autobiography of Moose, the dog who played Eddie in the first several seasons.

Merchandising

Home media 
Paramount Home Entertainment and (from 2006 onward) CBS DVD released all 11 seasons of Frasier on DVD in Region 1, 2 and 4. A 44-disc package containing the entire 11 seasons was also released.

On April 7, 2015, CBS DVD released Frasier: The Complete Series on DVD in Region 1.

A Blu-ray release was announced in September 2022.

The first four seasons were also released on VHS along with a series of 'Best Of' tapes. These tapes consisted of four episodes taken from seasons 1–4.

One Frasier CD was released featuring a number of songs taken from the show: Tossed Salads & Scrambled Eggs was released on October 24, 2000.

Books 
Several books about Frasier have been released, including:

References

Further reading

External links 

 
 

 
1990s American sitcoms
1993 American television series debuts
2000s American sitcoms
2004 American television series endings
American television spin-offs
Articles containing video clips
Best Musical or Comedy Series Golden Globe winners
Cheers
English-language television shows
Fictional portrayals of the Seattle Police Department
NBC original programming
Outstanding Performance by an Ensemble in a Comedy Series Screen Actors Guild Award winners
Peabody Award-winning television programs
Primetime Emmy Award for Outstanding Comedy Series winners
Primetime Emmy Award-winning television series
Television series about brothers
Television series about radio
Television series by CBS Studios
Television shows set in Seattle
Television shows filmed in Los Angeles
Works about psychoanalysis